The Université Alassane Ouattara is a public university in Côte d'Ivoire. It was known as Université de Bouaké prior to a name change in August 2012.

The school was founded in 1992. It was temporarily relocated to Abidjan in 2002, but reopened in Bouaké in 2011. Its units include:
Communication, Environment and Society
Administrative, Managerial and Legal Sciences
Economic and Developmental Sciences
Medical Sciences
Medical and Veterinary Centre
Research and Development Centre
Multipolar Institute
Regional Higher Education of Korhogo

The university is one of twelve worldwide to host a UNESCO chair in bioethics.

References

Universities in Ivory Coast
Bouaké
1992 establishments in Ivory Coast
Educational institutions established in 1992
Buildings and structures in Vallée du Bandama District